Scropton railway station was a short-lived railway station in Derbyshire, England.

The railway line between Uttoxeter and Burton-on-Trent was opened by the North Staffordshire Railway (NSR) in 1848 and a station to serve the village of Scropton was opened at about the same time (the actual date is imprecise but the station was mentioned in timetables issued in 1849–50).

The station remained open only for a short time before being closed at the beginning of 1866.  After closure the station site was used for exchange sidings between the narrow gauge Scropton Tramway and the NSR.

References

Sources

Further reading

Disused railway stations in Derbyshire
Former North Staffordshire Railway stations
Railway stations in Great Britain opened in 1849
Railway stations in Great Britain closed in 1866